Sunlight Solar Energy is an American national solar power company, headquartered in Bend, Oregon, that specializing in the design, finance, installation, and management of commercial and residential solar electric, solar hot water, solar pool, and radiant floor systems.  Sunlight Solar was founded in 1988 by Paul Israel, a graduate of Temple University and co-founder of the Central Oregon Green and Solar Tour. The company opened its first location in Redmond, Oregon in 1997 and began installing solar for RV's, solar hot water, and off-grid solar electric systems.  In 2003 the company moved operations to Bend, Oregon where the office's 3.6 Kilowatt photovoltaic system is monitored by Frank Vignola of the University of Oregon Solar Radiation Monitoring Lab which helped the Energy Trust of Oregon and Christopher Dymond of the Oregon Department of Energy calculate performance expectations for solar power production in Central Oregon.  In 2004 a state solar incentive program encouraged the company's expansion of operations to Milford, Connecticut.  In 2006 they became a premier dealer for SunPower photovoltaic panels.  In 2008 Sunlight Solar was awarded Sunpower's "Intelegant" award for excellence. In 2008 Sunlight Solar won the Central Oregon Builder's Association award for "Sub-Contractor of the Year". In 2009 the company expanded to Waltham, Massachusetts.  In 2010 the company opened an office in Portland, Oregon.  In 2010 Sunlight Solar partnered with Habitat for Humanity to install 25 photovoltaic systems on new production high performance homes.

Notable commercial installations 
 SEKO Worldwide – Portland, Oregon – 31.46 Kilowatts – 2010
 Saybrook Point Inn & Spa – Old Saybrook, Connecticut – 43 Kilowatts – 2009
 Temple Sinai – Reno, Nevada – 15 Kilowatts – 2009
 North Haven Health and Racquet – North Haven, Connecticut – 190 Kilowatts – 2009
 Home Federal Bank – Bend, Oregon – 9.41 Kilowatts – 2008
 West Bend Property Company – Bend, Oregon – 10.32 Kilowatts – 2008
 Extrusion Technologies – Randolph, Massachusetts – 60 Kilowatts – 2007
 Yale Divinity School – New Haven, Connecticut – 40.29 Kilowatts – 2007
 PV Powered  –  Bend, Oregon – 5.6 Kilowatts – 2007
 Thomas P. O'Neill, Jr. Federal Building - Boston, Massachusetts - 70 Kilowatts (combination of PV and Thermal) 
 Brown University Katherine Moran Coleman Aquatic Center - Providence, Rhode Island 51.74 Kilowatts (combination of PV and Thermal)
Facebook Data Center - Prineville, OR - 99 kilowatts - 2011

Notable residential installations 
 Boleyn Project – Happy Valley, Oregon – 4.75 Kilowatts – 2009
 Yarmoff Project – Westport, Connecticut – 11.5 Kilowatts – 2008
 Durno Project – Westport, Connecticut – 5 Kilowatts – 2008
 Vidas/Staley LEED Project – Bend, Oregon – 2.1 Kilowatts – 2008

References

External links 
 Company website

Solar energy companies of the United States
Companies based in Bend, Oregon
Energy companies established in 1988
Renewable resource companies established in 1988
1988 establishments in Oregon
American companies established in 1988